(also Romanized as ) is a town in Ḩaḑramawt Governorate, Yemen.

References

Populated places in Hadhramaut Governorate